Tatjana Maria was the defending champion, but chose to compete at the 2018 St. Petersburg Ladies' Trophy instead.

Madison Brengle won the title, defeating Jamie Loeb in the final 6–1, 6–2.

Seeds

Draw

Finals

Top half

Bottom half

External Links
Main Draw

Dow Tennis Classic - Singles